The FMK-3 is a selective fire blowback-operated submachine gun of Argentine origin designed by Fabricaciones Militares in 1974. Around 30,000 were produced for the Argentine military by 1991.

Development 

In the 1950s, the FMAP DM (Fábrica Militar de Armas Portables Domingo Matheu), belonging to the Dirección General de Fabricaciones Militares, acquired the production rights of a copy of the U.S. M3 A1 submachine gun, more commonly known as the "Grease Gun". This Argentine version was chambered for 9×19mm cartridges, as opposed to the .45 ACP in the original model. The DGFM released two versions called PAM 1 and PAM 2, with and without handle latch.

In the early  1970s, FMAP DM decided to change the design to use a telescoping bolt which allows a shorter weapon, and a magazine in the pistol grip. This concept was designed by Jaroslav Holecek in mid-1946 and greatly reduced the size of the weapon. He popularized the CZ-23/25 and it was later also adopted by the Israeli UZI, the Ingram MAC-10 and the Star Z-84. Thus was born the PA-3 DM, later known as the FMK-3.

At first glance, the FMK-3 may be associated with the UZI. This Argentine sub-machine gun fires the 9×19mm Parabellum cartridge and hosts its magazine in the pistol grip, along with a fire selector and grip safety on the rear of the grip which must be squeezed in order to fire the weapon. Above the hand grip, is the upper receiver which houses the  barrel, bolt and recoil spring.

In the first series, the FMK was presented with three versions of stocks: one-piece plastic fixed, fixed to wood, and retractable wire. On the left side of the upper receiver is located the charging handle. This has a sliding dust cover that prevents the entry of foreign materials in the interior of the weapon. On the same side but at the rear is the sling holder. In early versions, the front one is similar to the Uzi, although it went on to be captive and rotating in the shield that holds the barrel to the receiver. On the receiver aiming devices are: a hooded front post sight and a rear "L" shaped flip sight adjustable for windage and with 50 and 100 meters sight positions. It is all protected by side ears. The ejection window is  small sized and is located to the right of the aforementioned drawer or upper receiver.

Overview
The FMK-3 is chambered in 9×19mm Parabellum, with a rate of fire of 650 rounds per minute. 20-, 32-, and 40-round magazines are available for the FMK-3 as well as the adaption of a silencer and grenade-firing capability.

Unlike other similar submachine guns, the safety, the disconnect and auto sear the FMK-3 are located behind the handle. In this way, ahead of the trigger is only the selector mechanism of shot and the manual safety. The safety selector has a wing-type lever that is activated from the left and which presents three positions: upper intermediate, "S" (safe), "R" (repeat), and "A" (automatic fire).

As an additional security measure, the FMK-3 has a safety grip that acts in the following way: If the weapon is not correctly grasped, the safety locks the bolt. Thus, even if the gun is ready to fire, if not pressed, the bolt is blocked from closing and firing the weapon. In addition, as mentioned above, with the bolt at rest, empty chamber and the full magazine the grip safety prevents accidental discharge of the weapon drag. Therefore, it is a very safe weapon to carry in any condition.

Variants

FMK-3
Main variant and the most produced variant. The FMK-3 has a retractable wire stock. Fixed stocks have been recently made that can be installed by two prongs. FMK-3s have also been adapted with picatinny rails.

FMK-4
FMK-3 with fixed stock. The fixed stock appears to be made from polymer, and similar to that found on the H&K G3.

FMK-5
The FMK-3 is also produced for the civilian market, in semi-automatic-only version as the FMK-5.

Users

 : Used by Law enforcement in Argentina and Argentine Army.
 : Used by Bolivian Army.
 
 : Used by the military.
 : more than 600 FMK-3s received during the 1980s, used during the Salvadoran Civil War and later put into storage. Used in the 2010s by private security guards.
 : Used by Uruguayan Armed Forces and National Police of Uruguay.

See also
Uzi
Vz. 23

References

External links
Modern Firearms & Ammunition
The FMK3 submachine gun (archived)

9mm Parabellum submachine guns
Submachine guns of Argentina
Fabricaciones Militares